The following is a partial list of notable Mills College people. It includes alumnae, professors, and others associated with Mills College.

Alumnae and alumni
 Janus Adams - journalist and talk show host
 Laurie Anderson - performance artist and musician 
 John Bischoff - musician
 Kevin Blechdom - musician
 Renel Brooks-Moon - voice of the San Francisco Giants, first black baseball announcer 
 Trisha Brown - choreographer 
 Dave Brubeck - musician and composer 
Teresa Blankmeyer Burke - philosopher and bioethicist 
 Alice Sudduth Byerly (1855–1904) - temperance activist
 Peggie Castle - actress
 Sharon Cheslow - musician and artist
 King Lan Chew - dancer
Maya Chinchilla - poet
Marika Cifor - professor at University of Washington Information School.
 Martha Fuller Clark - New Hampshire State Senator
 Sofia Coppola - director  
 Elizabeth Crow (1968, B.A.) - editor and journalist
 Eunice Prieto Damron - ceramic artist
 Olivia de Havilland - actress 
 Vaughn De Leath
 Paul DeMarinis - artist, musician, composer
 Rosanna Castrillo Diaz - artist
 March Fong Eu - politician 
 Claire Falkenstein - sculptor, painter, print-maker and jewelry designer known for her large-scale abstract metal and glass sculptures
 Molissa Fenley - modern dancer 
 Jim Ferguson - guitarist and composer
 Guillermo Galindo composer/ sound artist
 Noah Georgeson - musician and producer
 Leah Gerber - Professor of Conservation Science at Arizona State University
 Helen Gilbert - artist
 April Catherine Glaspie - diplomat, United States Ambassador to Iraq during the Gulf War 
Ben Goldberg - composer and clarinetist 
 Michelle Cruz Gonzalez - musician, author 
 Beate Sirota Gordon - contributing author, as staff to Douglas MacArthur, of Japanese Constitution 
 Peter Gordon - composer
 Ariel Gore - author 
 Guðmundur Steinn Gunnarsson - composer
 Holly Herndon - composer, musician, and sound artist 
 Barbara Higbie - musician and composer 
 Claire Giannini Hoffman - first woman to serve on the boards of Bank of America and Sears, Roebuck & Company
 Kathy Jetnil-Kijiner - Marshallese poet and climate change activist
 Snatam Kaur - musician and activist
 Bevin Kelley - musician
 Nia King - art activist, multimedia journalist, podcaster, public speaker, and zine maker
 Ron Kuivila - musician and sound artist
 Michael Land - head of LucasArts sound department
 Dorianne Laux - award-winning poet
 Barbara Lee - U.S. Congresswoman for California's 9th Congressional District
 May Lee - CNN correspondent
 Phil Lesh - Grateful Dead bassist
 Cheena Marie Lo - poet
 Beverly Alexander Martin - author of "Destiny Deems"
 Charmian London - second wife and biographer of Jack London
 Jeffrey Luck Lucas - musician and composer
 Micheline Aharonian Marcom - novelist
 Jerry Martin - composer
 Miya Masaoka - musician and composer
 Billie June McCaskill - botanist
 Siobhon McManus - teacher and activist
 Constance Money - actress
 Elizabeth Murray - painter and MacArthur Fellow 
 Dasha Nekrasova - actress
 Amy X. Neuburg - musician and composer
 Joanna Newsom - musician
 Emma Kaili Metcalf Beckley Nakuina - writer
 Margaret Saunders Ott - pianist and music educator
 Diana L. Paxson - author
 Maggi Payne - composer and musician 
 Daniella Pineda
Dan Plonsey - saxophonist
 Johanna Poethig – visual, public and performance artist
 Dixy Lee Ray - Governor of Washington and chair of the U.S. Atomic Energy Commission 
 Dana Reason - composer and musician
 
Gino Robair - composer and percussionist  
 Steve Reich - composer
 Wendy Reid - composer and violinist
 Marc Anthony Richardson - novelist
 Manuel Rocha Iturbide - composer and sound artist
 Ana Roxanne - musician and singer
 Ananya Roy - professor of urban studies at UC Berkeley 
 Mia Satya (aka Mia Tu Mutch), community organizer and activist
 Beate Sirota - helped write the Japanese constitution
 Irma Tam Soong - historian
Morton Subotnick - composer
Michèle Taylor - U.S. Ambassador to the UN Human Rights Council
Grace Vamos - composer and cellist
 Dana Vespoli - pornographic actress
 Candace Vogler - philosopher
Katharine Mulky Warne - composer
 Gordon Watson - pianist 
William Winant - percussionist
Betty Ann Wong - composer
Hsiung-Zee Wong - composer and musician
 Jade Snow Wong - author and artist
 Connie Young Yu - author, historian, and lecturer

Faculty 
Robert Ashley
Fred Uhl Ball
Arthur Berger
Luciano Berio
John Bischoff
Chana Bloch
Lenore Blum
Anthony Braxton
Domenico Brescia
Anna Cox Brinton
Chris Brown
Dave Brubeck
Belle Bulwinkle
John Cage
India Cooke
Steed Cowart
Alvin Curran
Christopher R Davidson
Delaine Eastin
Hettie Belle Ege
Michelle Fillion
Fred Frith
Lou Harrison / Bill Colvig
 Joan Jeanrenaud
Congresswoman Barbara Lee
George E. Lewis
Yiyun Li
Hung Liu 	
Ajuan Mance
 R. Wood Massi 
 Helene Mayer (1910–1953) - German and American Olympic champion fencer
Darius Milhaud
Roscoe Mitchell
Diana O'Hehir
Pauline Oliveros
Kathleen Parlow
Roi Partridge
Maggi Payne
Elizabeth Marie Pope 
Stephen Ratcliffe
 Wendy Reid
Terry Riley
David Rosenboom
Moira Roth
Dean Rusk
Diana E.H. Russell
Kirsten Saxton
Robert Sheff
Laetitia Sonami
Glenn Spearman
Ellen Spertus
Homer Sprague
Zvezdelina Stankova
Susan Stryker
Morton Subotnick
Susan Summerfield
Toyoji Tomita
Grace Vamos
Catherine Wagner
William Winant

Trustees 
 Albert M. Bender
 Milton H. Myrick - founding trustee, 1875

References

Mills College people

Mills College